Jesús Padilla Gálvez (xe'sus pa'ðiʎa 'ɣalβeθ) (born October 28, 1959) is a philosopher who worked primarily in philosophy of language, logic, and the history of sciences.

Professional biography
Jesús Padilla Gálvez studied Philosophy, History and Mathematics at the University of Cologne (Germany) and was awarded the M.A. in 1983 and a Dr. phil. in Philosophy in 1988. He was Research Assistant (1988–1991) at the University of Murcia (Spain) and later held the post of Associate Professor (1992–1994) for Logic and Philosophy of Language at the University of León (Spain). From 1994 to 1999 he was Visiting Professor at the Johannes Kepler University in Linz (Austria). Since 1999 he has been Professor at the University of Castilla-La Mancha in Toledo (Spain). He has held visiting posts at the Universities of University of Erlangen-Nuremberg (Germany), University of Graz (Austria), University of Potsdam (Germany), University of Cambridge (United Kingdom), University of Munich (Germany), University of Vienna and the University of Oxford (United Kingdom). As director of the international scientific journal Dókos. Revista Filosófica - Philosophical Review (published in Ápeiron Ediciones (Madrid) and editor of the international series "Aporia / Aπορία" (De Gruyter) the author is continuously engaged with highly relevant philosophical topics.

Philosophical views
In his doctoral thesis, Padilla Gálvez examined central issues of analytic philosophy. His subsequent investigations are characterized by an application of the analytic method to the study of philosophical problems.  This method involves both, the analysis of language to eliminate ambiguity as well as a profound scrutiny of the logical form of philosophical propositions. Padilla Galvez's work may be classified into five lines of investigation: philosophy of language, logic, philosophy of history of science, social changes in democratic systems and language for specific purposes (LSP). He was dealing with the works of Gottfried Leibniz, Immanuel Kant, Edmund Husserl, Alfred Tarski, Ludwig Wittgenstein, Willard Van Orman Quine, Saul Kripke, among others. Padilla Gálvez is recognized as one of the leading experts of Ludwig Wittgenstein's philosophy in the English and Spanish-speaking world.
As the co-author of the "Wittgenstein Studien" he has published extensively in the field by focusing on logic-grammatical analysis of language. This includes such topics as history of logic and mathematics (Kurt Gödel), Action, Decision-Making and Forms of Life), Anthropology, language, aesthetics, politics (democracy and terrorism) and practical philosophy.

Awards and recognition
 Austrian Cross of Honour for Science and Art, 1st class (2020)

Bibliography
He is the author of
 "Referenz und Theorie der möglichen Welten". Peter Lang Verlag, Frankfurt a. M., 1989.() 
 "Tratado metateórico de las teorías científicas". Ediciones de la Universidad de Castilla-La Mancha, Cuenca, 2000. 
 "Sozioökonomische Einführung in die Interkulturalität". (Publicado con Margit Gaffal) Oldenbourg, München, 2005.
 "Verdad y demostración". Plaza y Valdés, Madrid, México D.F., 2007. Reseña en: Revista Latinoamericana de filosofía 
 "Wittgenstein I. Lecturas tractarianas". Plaza y Valdés, Madrid, México D.F., 2009.  
 "Yo, máscara y reflexión. estudios sobre la autorreferencia de la subjetividad". Plaza y Valdés, Madrid, México D.F., 2012.  
 "Hacia la representación perspicua. Wittgenstein 2". Tirant Humanidades, Valencia, 2014.
 "Parménides, Sobre la naturaleza, El desarrollo de una gramática metafísica". Ápeiron Ediciones, Madrid, 2015.. 
 "Verdad. Controversias abiertas". Tirant Humanidades, Valencia, 2017..
 "Estado de cosas. Reconstrucción de la polémica sobre el Sachverhalt". Tirant Humanidades, Valencia, 2018..
 "El mentiroso. Genealogía de una paradoja sobre verdad y autorreferencia". Tirant Humanidades, Valencia, 2021..
 "State of Affairs. Reconstructing the Controversy over Sachverhalt". Philosophia Verlag, München, 2021. (ISBN 978-3-88405-131-3).

Editor 

 "El Círculo de Viena, reconsiderado". Arbor, 1996, Nr. 612, Tomo CLV, pp. 7– 147.(1996) 
 "Wittgenstein y el Círculo de Viena / Wittgenstein und der Wiener Kreis". Ediciones de la Universidad de Castilla-La Mancha, Cuenca, 1998. 
 "Wittgenstein, from a New Point of View". Peter Lang, Frankfurt a. M., 2003. 
 "El laberinto del lenguaje: Wittgenstein y la filosofía analítica / The Labyrinth of Language: Ludwig Wittgenstein and the Analytic Philosophy". Ediciones de la Universidad de Castilla-La Mancha, Cuenca, 2007. 
 "Idealismus und Sprachanalytische Philosophie". Peter Lang Verlag, Frankfurt a.M., 2007. 
 "Phenomenology as Grammar". Ontos Verlag, Frankfurt a. M., Paris, Lancaster, New Brunswick, 2008. 
 "Igualdad en el derecho y la moral". Plaza y Valdés, Madrid, México D.F., 2009. 
 "Philosophical Anthropology. Wittgenstein's Perspective". Ontos Verlag, Frankfurt a. M., Paris, Lancaster, New Brunswick, 2010.  Review: "Notre Dame Philosophical Reviews" 
 "Wittgenstein: Issues and Debates". (with Eric Lemaire). Ontos Verlag, Frankfurt a. M., Paris, Lancaster, New Brunswick, 2010.  Review: Derek A. McDougall, Critical notice, British Wittgenstein Society 
 "Antropología filosófica de Wittgenstein. Reflexionando con P.M.S. Hacker". Plaza y Valdés, Madrid - México, 2011. 
 "Forms of Life and Language Games". (with Margit Gaffal). Ontos Verlag, Frankfurt a. M., Paris, Lancaster, New Brunswick, 2011.  
 "Fenomenologia como Gramática". Editora Universidade de Brasília, Brasília D.F., 2011.
 "Doubtful Certainties. Language-Games, Forms of Life, Relativism". (with Margit Gaffal). Ontos Verlag, Frankfurt a. M., Paris, Lancaster, New Brunswick, 2012.  
 "Formas de vida y juegos de lenguaje". Coedición con Margit Gaffal, Plaza y Valdés, Madrid - México 2013, 266 pp., . 
 "Action, Decision-Making and Forms of Life". (Ed. Jesús Padilla Gálvez). De Gruyter, Berlin - Boston, 2016, 168 pp., . 
 "Intentionality and Action". (Eds. Jesús Padilla Gálvez and Margit Gaffal). De Gruyter, Berlin - Boston, 2017, 180 pp., . 
 "Human Understanding as Problem". (Eds. Jesús Padilla Gálvez and Margit Gaffal). De Gruyter, Berlin - Boston, 2018, 165 pp., . 
 "Ontological Commitment Revisited.". (Ed. Jesús Padilla Gálvez). De Gruyter, Berlin - Boston, 2021, 170 pp., .

Translations 

 1995. Metalógica / Metalogik. Mathesis, XI, Nr. 2, 113-136 / 137–192.
 2007. Sobre consistencia y completitud en el sistema axiomático. Discusión sobre la ponencia del Sr. Gödel. Protocolo del 15 de enero de 1931. Mathesis III 21 (2007) 193–196.
 2011. Ludwig Wittgenstein, Nur die Erfahrung des gegewärtigen augenblickes hat Realität’... / Sólo la experiencia del momento actual es real’..., Hat es Sinn zu sagen "zwei Menschen hätten denselben Körper?... / ¿Tiene sentido decir que dos personas tienen el mismo cuerpo?....Dokos. Revista filosófica, Vols. 7-8, 2011, 53-72 ( - )
 2012. Ludwig Wittgenstein, Die normale Ausdrucksweise «Ich habe Zahnschmerzen» / El modo usual de la expresión «tengo dolor de muelas». Dokos. Revista filosófica, Vols. 9-10, 2012, 79-105 ( - )
 2014. Ludwig Wittgenstein, Escrito a máquina [The big typescript] [TS 213]. Transl., introduc. and critical notes from Jesús Padilla Gálvez. Editorial Trotta, Madrid, 2014, 692 p. . 
 2016. Ludwig Wittgenstein, Tratado lógico-filosófico / Logisch-philosophische Abhandlung. Ed. from TS 204, Transl., introduc. and critical notes from Jesús Padilla Gálvez. Tirant Humanidades, Valencia, 2016, 250 p. .
 2017. Ludwig Wittgenstein, Investigaciones Filosóficas. Transl., introduc. and critical notes from Jesús Padilla Gálvez. Editorial Trotta, Madrid, 2017. 329 págs. .
 2017. Ludwig Wittgenstein, Diktat für Schlick - Dictado para Schlick.  Transl., introduc. and critical notes from Jesús Padilla Gálvez and Margit Gaffal. Ápeiron Ediciones, Madrid, 2017. , .
 2019. Ludwig Wittgenstein, Tratado lógico-filosófico / Logisch-philosophische Abhandlung. 2nd Ed. from TS 204, Transl., introduc. and critical notes from Jesús Padilla Gálvez. Tirant Humanidades, Valencia, 2019, 258 p. .
 2021. Ludwig Wittgenstein, Investigaciones Filosóficas, Philosophische Untersuchungen. Transl., introd. and notes from Jesús Padilla Gálvez. 2nd. Editorial Trotta, Madrid, 2021. .

and of numerous articles in Diálogos, Grazer Philosophische Studien, Journal for General Philosophy of Science, Logos, Mathesis, Modern Logic, Philosophia Naturalis, Philosophisches Jahrbuch, Wittgenstein-Studien, Zeitschrift für Philosophische Forschung and other journals and collections.

References

External links
 Web from Jesús Padilla Gálvez, Universidad de Castilla-La Mancha 
 Phenomenology as Grammar 
 Forms of Life and Language Games 
 Language as Forms of Life 
 Philosophical Anthropology 
 Is there Certainty in our Form of Life? 
 Doubtful Certainties Language-Games, Forms of Life, Relativism 
 Die Verwendung des Wortes "Ich" bei L. Wittgenstein 
 Beweis und Widerspruchsfreiheit 
 Minima visibilia 
 La variación como procedimiento de investigación. Una nueva aproximación a las obras de L. Wittgenstein 
 Democracy in Times of Ochlocracy 

1959 births
Living people
People from Almería
Philosophers of language
Analytic philosophers
Wittgensteinian philosophers
Logicians
Philosophers of logic
Philosophers of mind
Philosophers of science
Philosophy academics
Philosophy writers
20th-century Spanish philosophers
21st-century Spanish philosophers
Ontologists
Ordinary language philosophy
University of Cologne alumni
Academic staff of Johannes Kepler University Linz
Academic staff of the University of Castilla–La Mancha
Recipients of the Austrian Cross of Honour for Science and Art